This is a list of Danish football transfers for the 2008-09 winter transfer window. Only moves featuring at least one Danish Superliga club are listed.

The 2008-09 Danish Superliga had its winter break between 8 December 2008 and 28 February 2009. The winter transfer window opened on 1 January 2009, although a few transfers took place prior to that date; although a carry-over from the summer 2008 transfer window. The window closed at midnight on 2 February 2009. Players without a club may join one at any time, either during or in between transfer windows. If need be, clubs may sign a goalkeeper on an emergency loan, if all others are unavailable.

Transfers

Notes
 The player officially joined his new club on 1 January 2009.
 The deal went through during the transfer window of the Russian Premier League.
 The deal went through during the transfer window of the Swedish Allsvenskan.
 The deal went through during the transfer window of the Norwegian Premier League.

References 

Danish
2008-09
2008–09 in Danish football